The Gebidum (also known as Gibidum) is a mountain of the Swiss Pennine Alps, overlooking Visperterminen in the canton of Valais. An antenna is located on the summit.

References

External links
 Gebidum on Hikr

Mountains of the Alps
Mountains of Switzerland
Mountains of Valais
Two-thousanders of Switzerland